Antoine-Augustin Auger (8 May 1761 – 21 June 1836) was a French politician.

Born in Liancourt, Oise, he was elected an alternate member of the National Convention in 1792 after being administrator of the district of Chaumont - in effect he sat from 1793 onwards as the replacement for the dead marquis de Villette. He became secretary to the Convention in 1795 and was chosen by his colleagues on 4 brumaire that year to be a member of the Council of Five Hundred. He later entered the magistracy in which he would remain until the Bourbon Restoration.

1761 births
People from Oise
Deputies to the French National Convention
1836 deaths